Roscoe H. Channing, Jr. (January 7, 1868 – April 1, 1961) was an All-American football player, member of the Rough Riders and mining executive.  Channing was an All-American halfback for Princeton University.  He was one of eleven players selected by Caspar Whitney for the first ever College Football All-America Team in 1889.  When the Spanish–American War commenced in 1898, Channing enlisted in Theodore Roosevelt's Rough Riders.  Roosevelt took pride in how many Ivy League football players enlisted in the Rough Riders.  Channing later went into the mining business and managed the mining operations of the Whitney family.  In the 1920s, he formed a partnership with his friend Cornelius Vanderbilt Whitney.  The two formed the Hudson Bay Mining and Smelting Company in Flin Flon, Saskatchewan, Canada, and Channing served as the company's President.  Channing died in 1961.

References

1961 deaths
1868 births
19th-century players of American football
All-American college football players
American football halfbacks
American military personnel of the Spanish–American War
American mining businesspeople
Princeton Tigers football players
Players of American football from New York City